3D is the fourth studio album by American girl group TLC, released on October 10, 2002, by Arista Records. Recorded from May 2001 to July 2002, much of the album was finalized after the death of member Lisa "Left Eye" Lopes, with her unreleased material that she had recorded for her solo albums Supernova and N.I.N.A. being reworked into new songs. Remaining group members Rozonda Thomas and Tionne Watkins enlisted Dallas Austin, Babyface, Rodney Jerkins, the Neptunes, Raphael Saadiq, Missy Elliott and Timbaland to work with them on 3D.

The album debuted at number six on the US Billboard 200 and at number four on the Top R&B/Hip-Hop Albums chart, selling 143,000 copies in its first week of release, and was met with positive reviews from critics. It has been certified platinum by the Recording Industry Association of America (RIAA). 3D earned TLC two Grammy Award nominations and spawned three singles, including "Girl Talk", peaking at number 23 on the Hot R&B/Hip-Hop Songs chart; "Hands Up", which peaked at number seven on the Bubbling Under R&B/Hip-Hop Singles chart and "Damaged", which managed to peak at number 19 on the US Mainstream Top 40 chart.

Background information
During and after the release of TLC's third studio album, FanMail (1999), Lopes made it known to the press on multiple occasions that she felt that she was unable to fully express herself working with the group. Her contributions to the songs had been reduced to periodic eight-bar raps, and studio session singers such as Debra Killings often took her place on the background vocals for the group's songs. In its November 26, 1999, issue, Entertainment Weekly ran a letter from Lopes that challenged her group mates to record solo albums and let the fans judge which of the three was the most talented:

"I challenge Tionne 'Player' Watkins and Rozonda 'Hater' Thomas to an album entitled The Challenge. A 3 CD set that contains three solo albums. Each [album]... will be due to the record label by October 1, 2000... I also challenge Dallas 'The Manipulator' Austin to produce all of the material and do it at a fraction of his normal rate. As I think about it, I'm sure LaFace would not mind throwing in a 1.5 million dollar prize for the winner."

Watkins and Thomas declined to take up Lopes' challenge, though Lopes always maintained it was a great idea. Things were heated between the women for some time, with Thomas speaking out against Lopes, calling her antics "selfish", "evil", and "heartless". TLC then addressed these fights by saying that they were very much like sisters that occasionally have their disagreements; as Lopes stated, "It's deeper than a working relationship. We have feelings for each other, which is why we get so mad at each other. I usually say that you cannot hate someone unless you love them. So, we love each other. That's the problem." The women eventually settled the feud, and The Challenge was never followed through. After the conclusion of the successful FanMail Tour, the women, however, took some time off and pursued personal interests. Lopes was the first to begin recording her solo album, Supernova, though it underperformed internationally and was never released in the United States.

During this time period, Thomas had begun working on a solo project until she realized that rumors of TLC's demise had taken over in the media. It was then that Thomas made a call to LaFace label-head L.A. Reid to discuss working on TLC's fourth studio album. After contacting Watkins, and soon after, Lopes, sessions for 3D began in May 2001. However, soon after recording had begun, sessions came to a halt, as Lopes began work on her second studio album, known as N.I.N.A. (New Identity Non Applicable). In January 2002, as Watkins was hospitalized due to complications stemming from her ongoing battle with sickle cell anemia, Lopes eventually came to visit her in the hospital and went back to the studio to record raps for 3D. In April 2002, as Watkins' condition improved greatly, Lopes went to Honduras to do missionary work and also record a documentary film about her life.

On April 25, 2002, Lopes was killed in a car crash, leaving behind material that she had recorded for both N.I.N.A. and 3D. Watkins and Thomas decided to use three of Lopes' newly recorded raps that were specifically recorded for the album ("Quickie", "Girl Talk", and "Who's It Gonna Be?"); the other songs that feature her in it were unreleased raps from her solo album sessions. The unreleased vocals were featured on the songs "Quickie", "Over Me" and "Give It to Me While It's Hot".

Watkins and Thomas decided that they would complete the remainder of their fourth album, to be called 3D, which featured production from Rodney Jerkins, the Neptunes, Raphael Saadiq, Missy Elliott and Timbaland. The decision was also made that TLC would continue on as a duo rather than replace Lopes. The group went on a hiatus, but announced in 2009 that they would possibly begin recording a fifth studio album.

Critical reception

3D received generally positive reviews from music critics. At Metacritic, which assigns a normalized rating out of 100 to reviews from mainstream publications, the album received an average score of 71, based on 14 reviews. Stephen Thomas Erlewine from AllMusic praised the album as "one of the best modern soul albums of 2002" and called it "a bittersweet triumph". He found that while 3D "perhaps doesn't blaze trails like their other albums, it never plays it safe and it always satisfies." Andy Battaglia of The A.V. Club wrote that "in spite of a slim body of songs and an occasionally half-finished feel, the group stakes a solid claim to the riches of future-soul with 3D, leaving a distinct stamp on even its weakest material with gorgeous singing built around the understated grace of '60s girl groups."

Billboard magazine found that "with 3D, TLC has crafted a fitting tribute to a departed sister", calling it "a nearly perfect collection." David Browne of Entertainment Weekly remarked that "thanks to such hired guns as the Neptunes and Rodney Jerkins, TLC have made a better post-tragedy album than expected. 3D is a smorgasbord of modern R&B that ranges from silky to retro." He noted however that the album "still, feels a little incomplete, like much of their work." Rolling Stone writer Barry Walters concluded that "the album isn't the romp it might have been had Lopes survived, but 3D solidly embodies black pop in a year in which it has lacked a center." Dorian Lynskey from Blender felt that "3Ds sheer creative vibrancy is itself a testament to Lopes's live-wire charisma", while Dimitri Ehrlich from Vibe noted that "while the CD is consistently well-produced and performed, the material recorded before Lopes's death [...] is simply darker, sexier, and angrier."

Commercial performance
In the United States, 3D debuted at number six on the Billboard 200 and at number four on the Top R&B/Hip-Hop Albums chart. Selling 143,000 copies, it sold less than half of the first-week total scored by previous album FanMail (1999), which had opened at number one on the chart with 318,000 units. It also marked TLC's lowest-charting album since Ooooooohhh... On the TLC Tip (1992). On December 10, 2002, 3D was certified platinum by the Recording Industry Association of America (RIAA) for shipments in excess of one million copies. By November 2004, the album had sold 680,000 units in the United States, As of July 2017 it has sold 693,000 copies, according to Billboard.

Internationally, 3D failed to reach the top 40 on the majority of the charts it appeared on, except Canada, where it managed to debut and peak at number 31 on the Canadian Albums Chart. Nevertheless, the album was particularly successful in Japan, reaching number two on the Oricon Albums Chart and earning a platinum certification from the Recording Industry Association of Japan (RIAJ) in November 2002.

Track listing

Notes
  signifies a co-producer

Sample credits
 "Quickie" contains voice samples from "Left Pimpin", a track from Lopes' unreleased N.I.N.A. album.
 "Over Me" uses a different take of a verse originally from "I Believe in Me", recorded for Supernova.
 "Give It to Me While It's Hot" reuses the second verse from "Friends", included on the Japanese edition of Supernova.

Personnel
Credits adapted from the liner notes of 3D.

Musicians

 Dallas Austin – arrangements 
 Rick Sheppard – MIDI, sound design 
 Chilli – background vocals 
 Tionne "T-Boz" Watkins – background vocals 
 Debra Killings – background vocals ; bass 
 Marde Johnson – additional vocals ; background vocals 
 Tierra Johnson – additional vocals 
 Sharliss Asbury – additional vocals 
 Jasper Cameron – additional vocals 
 Cindy Pace – additional background vocals 
 Eddie Hustle – all instruments 
 Rodney Jerkins – all music ; drum overdubs ; intro vocals ; intro 
 Tomi Martin – guitar 
 Danny O'Donoghue – guitar 
 Alex Greggs – drum overdubs 
 Riprock n Alex G – digital programming 
 Pharrell Williams – all instruments 
 Chad Hugo – all instruments 
 Tron Austin – intro vocals 
 Lisa "Left Eye" Lopes – rap 
 Babyface – all keyboards, drum programming, electric guitar, acoustic guitar 
 Tavia Ivey – background vocals 
 Tony Reyes – guitar 
 Colin Wolfe – bass 
 Sigurdur Birkis – drums 
 Tom Knight – drums 
 DJ Ruckus – scratches 
 Missy Elliott – background vocals 
 Chase Rollison – background vocals 
 Lester Finnel – background vocals 
 Bill Diggins – background vocals 
 Mark Pitts – background vocals 
 Shawn Beasley – background vocals 
 Raphael Saadiq – guitar, bass 
 Jake and the Phatman – drum programming 
 Kelvin Wooten – keyboards 
 Organized Noize – arrangements, drum programming, music programming 
 Shorty B – bass 
 Marqueze Ethridge – vocal arrangement 
 Chanz Parkman – vocal arrangement

Technical

 Dallas Austin – production ; executive production
 Carlton Lynn – recording ; Pro Tools engineering 
 Rick Sheppard – recording 
 Tim Lauber – engineering assistance 
 Paul Sheehy – engineering assistance 
 Kevin "KD" Davis – mixing 
 Dion Peters – mix engineering assistance 
 Christine Sirois – engineering assistance 
 Eddie Hustle – production 
 Josh Butler – recording 
 Leslie Brathwaite – recording ; mixing 
 Steve Fisher – engineering assistance ; recording 
 Rodney Jerkins – production, vocal production, mixing 
 Fabian Marasciullo – recording 
 Mark "DJ Exit" Goodchild – recording 
 The Neptunes – production 
 Andrew "Drew" Coleman – recording 
 Brian Garten – recording 
 Frannie Graham – engineering assistance 
 Cedric Anderson – engineering assistance 
 Phil Tan – mixing 
 John Horesco IV – mix engineering assistance 
 Jean-Marie Horvat – mixing 
 Babyface – production 
 Daryl Simmons – production 
 Paul Boutin – recording 
 Craig Taylor – engineering assistance 
 Serban Ghenea – mixing 
 Tim Roberts – mix engineering assistance 
 John Hanes – Pro Tools engineering 
 Ivy Skoff – production coordination 
 Doug Harms – engineering assistance 
 Victor McCoy – engineering assistance 
 Timbaland – production, mixing 
 Missy Elliott – production 
 Carlos "El Loco" Bedoya – recording 
 Jimmy Douglas – mixing 
 Raphael Saadiq – production 
 Jake and the Phatman – co-production 
 Gerry "The Gov" Brown – mixing 
 John Tanksley – mix engineering assistance 
 Anette Sharvit – production coordination 
 Cory Williams – engineering assistance 
 Organized Noize – production 
 Sean Davis – recording 
 John Frye – recording 
 Morgan Garcia – recording 
 Lisa "Left Eye" Lopes – album production
 Chilli – album production
 Tionne "T-Boz" Watkins – album production
 Bill Diggins – album production
 Herb Powers Jr. – mastering
 TLC – executive production
 Antonio "L.A." Reid – executive production

Artwork
 Joe Mama-Nitzberg – creative direction
 Jeff Schulz – art direction, design
 Seb Janiak – cover photo, Lisa "Left Eye" Lopes photo
 Guy Aroch – inside photo

Charts

Weekly charts

Year-end charts

Certifications

Release history

Notes

References

2002 albums
Albums produced by Babyface (musician)
Albums produced by Dallas Austin
Albums produced by Missy Elliott
Albums produced by the Neptunes
Albums produced by Organized Noize
Albums produced by Raphael Saadiq
Albums produced by Rodney Jerkins
Albums produced by Timbaland
Albums published posthumously
Arista Records albums
TLC (group) albums